There are four hospitals in Macau providing basic and primary health care services to the people of Macau:

 Hospital Conde S. Januário - public hospital
 Kiang Wu Hospital - private hospital
 Macau University of Science and Technology Hospital (also known as MUST Hospital or University Hospital) - private hospital
 Macau Yinkui Hospital - private hospital (www.yinkui.com.mo)

List of healthcare centers in Macau
 Areia Preta Health Center
 Coloane Health Center
 Macau Oriental Health Center (Tap Seac)
 North Health Center (Fai Chi Kei)
 Porto Interior Health Center
 S. Lourenço Health Center
 Taipa Health Center

Former hospitals
St. Raphel's Hospital opened in 1569 and was the first hospital in China and Macau to offer Western medicine. It closed in 1974 to focus on elderly care. It is now home to the Consulate of Portugal in Macau.

See also
Healthcare in Macau
List of hospitals in China

References

 
Hospitals
Macau
Macau
Hospitals
Macau
China health-related lists